Aishwarya Nedunchezhiyan (born 1 January 1996) is an Indian sailor. She won the bronze medal at 2014 Asian Games in Women's 29er event, along with Varsha Gautham.

References

External links

 
 

1996 births
Living people
Indian female sailors (sport)
Asian Games medalists in sailing
Asian Games bronze medalists for India
Sailors at the 2014 Asian Games
Medalists at the 2014 Asian Games